The American Unitarian Association (AUA) was a religious denomination in the United States and Canada, formed by associated Unitarian congregations in 1825. In 1961, it consolidated with the Universalist Church of America to form the Unitarian Universalist Association.

The AUA was formed in 1825 in the aftermath of a split within New England's Congregational churches between those congregations that embraced Unitarian doctrines and those that maintained Calvinist theology.

According to Mortimer Rowe, the Secretary (i.e. chief executive) of the British Unitarians for 20 years, the AUA was founded on the same day as the British and Foreign Unitarian Association: "By a happy coincidence, in those days of slow posts, no transatlantic telegraph, telephone or wireless, our American cousins, in complete ignorance as to the details of what was afoot, though moving towards a similar goal, founded the American Unitarian Association on precisely the same day—May 26, 1825."

The AUA's official journal was The Christian Register (1821–1961).

Notable member congregations 
First Unitarian Church (Baltimore, Maryland)
Federal Street Church (Boston)
First Unitarian Church of Philadelphia
Unitarian Church of All Souls
First Unitarian Universalist Society of San Francisco
First Unitarian Church of Oakland
First Unitarian Church of Berkeley
First Unitarian Church of Riverside
First Unitarian Church of Chicago
Unitarian Church of Urbana
First Unitarian Church of Detroit
Unitarian Universalist Church of Lancaster, Pennsylvania
All Souls Church, Unitarian (Washington, D.C.)
Unitarian Universalist Church of Arlington
Unitarian Church in Charleston

See also
Joseph Priestley House
List of Unitarian, Universalist, and Unitarian Universalist churches
Meadville Lombard Theological School
Theophilus Lindsey
William Ellery Channing

References

Bibliography
 
 

Religious organizations established in 1825
Former Christian denominations
Religious organizations disestablished in 1961
Unitarianism
Protestant denominations established in the 19th century
1825 establishments in the United States